The following television stations operate on virtual channel 11 in the United States:

 K06AV-D in Wolf Point, Montana
 K06IQ-D in Newberry Springs, California
 K06KQ-D in Manhattan, Nevada
 K07BW-D in Westcliffe, Colorado
 K07EQ-D in Ekalaka, Montana
 K08HN-D in Aspen, Colorado
 K08IP-D in Baker, Montana
 K08OY-D in Plains, Montana
 K09IV-D in Plevna, Montana
 K09ZS-D in Gateway, Colorado
 K10RW-D in Lake Havasu, Arizona
 K11CS-D in Rock Island, Washington
 K11FJ-D in Squilchuck St. Park, Washington
 K11LM-D in Thomasville, Colorado
 K11QE-D in Skagway, Alaska
 K11QG-D in Toksook Bay, Alaska
 K11QI-D in Ambler, Alaska
 K11QY-D in Kwethluk, Alaska
 K11UU-D in Pago Pago, American Samoa
 K11WZ-D in Delta Junction, etc., Alaska
 K11XF-D in Woodland, Utah
 K11XG-D in Logan, Utah
 K11XK-D in Helper, Utah
 K11XP-D in Boise, Idaho
 K12QY-D in Leamington, Utah
 K12RF-D in Healy, etc., Alaska
 K12XC-D in Salina & Redmond, Utah
 K12XG-D in Roosevelt, Utah
 K12XH-D in Price, Utah
 K13FP-D in Wolf Point, Montana
 K13JD-D in Battle Mountain, Nevada
 K13ZI-D in Colorado Springs, Colorado
 K13ZN-D in Heron, Montana
 K13AAM-D in Garrison, etc., Utah
 K14LZ-D in Alexandria, Minnesota
 K14QZ-D in Mount Pleasant, Utah
 K14RO-D in St. George, etc., Utah
 K14RX-D in Ashland, Montana
 K14SD-D in South Lake Tahoe, California
 K15HM-D in Montezuma Creek/Aneth, Utah
 K15KB-D in Squaw Valley, Oregon
 K15KW-D in Philipsburg, Montana
 K15LJ-D in Enterprise, etc., Utah
 K16EM-D in Prineville, etc., Oregon
 K16HI-D in Navajo Mountain, Utah
 K16HJ-D in Oljeto, Utah
 K16HK-D in Mexican Hat, Utah
 K16MK-D in Laketown, etc., Utah
 K16MM-D in Circleville, Utah
 K16MR-D in Gateway, Colorado
 K16MX-D in Myton, Utah
 K16NB-D in Ely & McGill, Nevada
 K17CA-D in Carson City, Nevada
 K17DG-D in Rural Summit County, Utah
 K17DT-D in Elko, Nevada
 K17JA-D in Basalt, Colorado
 K17JC-D in Orderville, Utah
 K17MI-D in Eads, etc., Colorado
 K17NE-D in Arlee, Montana
 K17NM-D in Scipio, Utah
 K17NU-D in Ruth, Nevada
 K18DN-D in Kanab, Utah
 K18GT-D in Ryndon, Nevada
 K18JM-D in Northome, Minnesota
 K18ME-D in Richfield, etc., Utah
 K19BY-D in Grangeville, etc., Idaho
 K19HE-D in Bluff, Utah
 K19HZ-D in Jackson, Minnesota
 K19LF-D in Koosharem, Utah
 K19LH-D in Teasdale, etc., Utah
 K19LK-D in Panguitch, Utah
 K19LL-D in Henrieville, Utah
 K19LO-D in Rural Sevier County, Utah
 K19MJ-D in Yerington, Nevada
 K20JV-D in Overton, Nevada
 K20JY-D in Olivia, Minnesota
 K20JZ-D in Green River, Utah
 K20LD-D in Ely, Nevada
 K20MN-D in Red Lake, Minnesota
 K20MR-D in Garfield, etc., Utah
 K20MZ-D in Mayfield, Utah
 K20NK-D in Cedar City, Utah
 K20NQ-D in Orangeville, Utah
 K21CA-D in Plains, Montana
 K21HV-D in Malad, Idaho
 K21IA-D in Waipake, Hawaii
 K21MR-D in Soda Springs, Idaho
 K21NF-D in Roseau, Minnesota
 K21OK-D in Lund & Preston, Nevada
 K22FH-D in Hawthorne, Nevada
 K22JC-D in Silver Springs, Nevada
 K22KU-D in Redwood Falls, Minnesota
 K22KY-D in Poplar, Montana
 K22MI-D in Drummond, Montana
 K23FR-D in Winnemucca, Nevada
 K23IV-D in Spring Glen, Utah
 K23JN-D in Virgin, Utah
 K23KR-D in Alton, Utah
 K23NP-D in Thompson Falls, Montana
 K23NW-D in Montrose, Colorado
 K24DD-D in Plevna, Montana
 K24EY-D in Walker Lake, Nevada
 K24HG-D in Cozad, Nebraska
 K24MH-D in Powers, Oregon
 K24ML-D in Taos, New Mexico
 K25FZ-D in Grand Junction, Colorado
 K25HG-D in Preston, Idaho
 K25KV-D in Huntington, Utah
 K25LE-D in Las Animas, Colorado
 K25OW-D in Marysvale, Utah
 K25PQ-D in Fallon, Nevada
 K25QI-D in Woody Creek, Colorado
 K26IT-D in Redstone, etc., Colorado
 K26LM-D in Libby, Montana
 K26OC-D in Delta, Oak City, Utah
 K27KD-D in Hatch, Utah
 K27KR-D in Fishlake Resort, Utah
 K27LL-D in Big Falls, Minnesota
 K27OM-D in Valmy, Nevada
 K28GC-D in Gothenburg, Nebraska
 K28GQ-D in Rural Iron, etc., Utah
 K28OJ-D in Tropic & Cannonville, Utah
 K28OO-D in Fountain Green, Utah
 K28PU-D in Randolph, Utah
 K29CK-D in Carbondale, Colorado
 K29HL-D in Hanalei, etc., Hawaii
 K29IM-D in Samak, Utah
 K29IN-D in Coalville and adjacent area, Utah
 K29IX-D in Caineville, Utah
 K29MA-D in Boulder, Utah
 K29ME-D in Antonito, Colorado
 K29MI-D in Parowan, Enoch, etc., Utah
 K29MJ-D in Rockville, Utah
 K29MR-D in Emery, Utah
 K29MV-D in Spring Glen, Utah
 K29ND-D in Hot Springs, Montana
 K30AL-D in Iola, Kansas
 K30FV-D in Cambridge, Nebraska
 K30JE-D in Lihue, Hawaii
 K30PC-D in Henefer & Echo, Utah
 K30PO-D in Scofield, Utah
 K30QH-D in Burley, etc., Idaho
 K31EF-D in Frost, Minnesota
 K31FN-D in Manti & Ephraim, Utah
 K31IF-D in Hagerman, Idaho
 K31IV-D in Romeo, Colorado
 K31KQ-D in Plains, Montana
 K31OO-D in Green River, Utah
 K31OS-D in Ferron, Utah
 K31OT-D in Clear Creek, Utah
 K31PK-D in Birchdale, Minnesota
 K32IU-D in Wanship, Utah
 K32KQ-D in Orovada, Nevada
 K32MY-D in Heber/Midway, Utah
 K32NA-D in Ridgecrest, California
 K32NW-D in Mina/Luning, Nevada
 K33CP-D in Gold Beach, Oregon
 K33GB-D in Golconda, Nevada
 K33IB-D in Silver Springs, Nevada
 K33JE-D in Modena/Beryl, etc., Utah
 K33OH-D in Ferndale, etc., Montana
 K33OI-D in Hanksville, Utah
 K33OR-D in St. Ignatius, Montana
 K34FP-D in Valmy, Nevada
 K34IS-D in Kilauea, Hawaii
 K34LJ-D in Kabetogama, Minnesota
 K34NZ-D in Fremont, Utah
 K34OT-D in Toquerville & Leeds, Utah
 K34PQ-D in Plains, Montana
 K34PV-D in Cortez, Colorado
 K35IK-D in Duchesne, Utah
 K35JL-D in Nephi, Utah
 K35JS-D in Lamar, Colorado
 K35MT-D in Port Orford, Oregon
 K35NG-D in Escalante, Utah
 K35NQ-D in Mesa, Colorado
 K36FF-D in Shurz, Nevada
 K36FM-D in Beaver, etc., Utah
 K36FT-D in Santa Clara, etc., Utah
 K36GL-D in Lovelock, Nevada
 K36IJ-D in Anahola, etc., Hawaii
 K36IL-D in Hanna & Tabiona, Utah
 K36IQ-D in Vernal, etc., Utah
 K36KN-D in Eureka, Nevada
 K36LB-D in Cheyenne Wells, Colorado
 K36LE-D in Manila, etc., Utah
 K36OE-D in Garfield County, Utah
 K38AJ-D in Blanding/Monticello, Utah
 K41LC-D in Long Valley Junction, Utah
 K42IX-D in Antimony, Utah
 K46HL-D in Susanville, etc., California
 K47NW-D in International Falls, Minnesota
 K50HJ-D in Litchfield, California
 KARE in Minneapolis, Minnesota
 KBWU-LD in Richland, etc., Washington
 KBYU-TV in Provo, Utah
 KCBD in Lubbock, Texas
 KCBY-TV in Coos Bay, Oregon
 KCHF in Santa Fe, New Mexico
 KDIN-TV in Des Moines, Iowa
 KDTP in Holbrook, Arizona
 KELO-TV in Sioux Falls, South Dakota
 KFFX-TV in Pendleton, Oregon
 KFNR in Rawlins, Wyoming
 KGIN in Grand Island, Nebraska
 KHAW-TV in Hilo, Hawaii
 KHET in Honolulu, Hawaii
 KHOU in Houston, Texas
 KKCO in Grand Junction, Colorado
 KKRM-LD in Chico, California
 KKTV in Colorado Springs, Colorado
 KMLU in Columbia, Louisiana
 KMSB in Tucson, Arizona
 KMVT in Twin Falls, Idaho
 KNTV in San Jose, California
 KOED-TV in Tulsa, Oklahoma
 KOTR-LD in Monterey, California
 KPLR-TV in St. Louis, Missouri
 KQME in Lead, South Dakota
 KQSD-TV in Lowry, South Dakota
 KRII in Chisholm, Minnesota
 KRXI-TV in Reno, Nevada
 KSNG in Garden City, Kansas
 KSTW in Tacoma, Washington
 KTHV in Little Rock, Arkansas
 KTTV in Los Angeles, California
 KTVA in Anchorage, Alaska
 KTVF in Fairbanks, Alaska
 KTVT in Fort Worth, Texas
 KTWU in Topeka, Kansas
 KUFM-TV in Missoula, Montana
 KVLY-TV in Fargo, North Dakota
 KXMD-TV in Williston, North Dakota
 W11DH-D in Wabasso, Florida
 W11DR-D in Wilmington, North Carolina
 W18EZ-D in Delphi, Indiana
 W34DQ-D in Pittsburg, New Hampshire
 W36FE-D in Hanover, New Hampshire
 WBAL-TV in Baltimore, Maryland
 WBKB-TV in Alpena, Michigan
 WDNZ-LD in Glasgow, Kentucky
 WEBU-LD in Water Valley, Mississippi
 WEKW-TV in Keene, New Hampshire
 WENH-TV in Durham, New Hampshire
 WETV-CD in Murfreesboro, Tennessee
 WFSU-TV in Tallahassee, Florida
 WGSI-CD in Murrells Inlet, South Carolina
 WHAS-TV in Louisville, Kentucky
 WINK-TV in Fort Myers, Florida
 WJDP-LD in Pigeon Forge, Tennessee
 WJHL-TV in Johnson City, Tennessee
 WLED-TV in Littleton, New Hampshire
 WLII-DT in Caguas, Puerto Rico
 WLJT-DT in Lexington, Tennessee
 WLUK-TV in Green Bay, Wisconsin
 WOME-LD in Orlando, Florida
 WPHJ-LD in Baxley, Georgia
 WPIX in New York, New York
 WPNY-LD in Utica, etc., New York
 WPXI in Pittsburgh, Pennsylvania
 WTOC-TV in Savannah, Georgia
 WTOK-TV in Meridian, Mississippi
 WTOL in Toledo, Ohio
 WTTW in Chicago, Illinois
 WTVD in Durham, North Carolina
 WTXI-LD in Miami, Florida
 WTZT-CD in Athens, Alabama
 WVAH-TV in Charleston, West Virginia
 WXIA-TV in Atlanta, Georgia

The following stations, which are no longer licensed, formerly operated on virtual channel 11 in the United States:
 K04GP-D in Alyeska, Alaska
 K08LW-D in Kenai/Soldotna, Alaska
 K11BI-D in Entiat, Washington
 K11QN-D in Aniak, Alaska
 K11RQ-D in Chignik Lake, Alaska
 K11VP-D in Homer-Seldovia, Alaska
 K15AG-D in Ninilchik, Alaska
 K18MU-D in Round Mountain, Nevada
 K26EH-D in Austin, Nevada
 K29KH-D in Kasilof, Alaska
 K36IN-D in Fruitland, etc., Utah
 K41HH-D in Austin, Nevada
 K48IJ-D in Preston, Idaho
 K49EA-D in Crowley Lake, California
 K50MO-D in Palmer, Alaska
 KSWT in Yuma, Arizona
 W40AN-D in Escanaba, Michigan
 WMTO-LD in Manteo, North Carolina

References

11 virtual